Jamie Delgado and Jonathan Marray are the defending Champions, but they have not partnered up together.
Delgado partnered up with Ken Skupski, but lost in the quarterfinals to Nicolas Mahut and Nicolas Renavand, while Marray played alongside Olivier Charroin, but they lost in the final to Martin Kližan and Igor Zelenay 6–7(5–7), 6–4, [4–10].

Seeds

Draw

Draw

External Links
 Main Draw

BNP Paribas Primrose Bordeaux - Doubles
2012 Doubles